Krasnoflotskoye is a rural locality (a selo) and the administrative center of Krasnoflotskoye Rural Settlement, Petropavlovsky District, Voronezh Oblast, Russia. The population was 1,069 as of 2010. There are 7 streets.

Geography 
Krasnoflotskoye is located 35 km west of Petropavlovka (the district's administrative centre) by road. Ogarev is the nearest rural locality.

References 

Rural localities in Petropavlovsky District, Voronezh Oblast